K S Alagiri  is an Indian politician representing the party Indian National Congress. He is the president of Tamil Nadu Congress party and an ex-member of the Parliament of India from Cuddalore Constituency. 
Previously, he was elected to the Tamil Nadu legislative assembly as an Indian National Congress candidate from Chidambaram constituency in 1991 election, and as a Tamil Maanila Congress candidate in 1996 election.

Early life
He was born in 1952. He graduated from Annamalai University, Chidambaram and is a native of Cuddalore district in North Tamil Nadu.

Positions held
State President – Tamil Nadu Congress Committee [Feb 2019–present]
Member of Parliament of India (2009–2014)
Member of Legislative Assembly of Tamil Nadu (1991–2001)

Electoral performance

Lok Sabha elections

Assembly elections

References 

Indian National Congress politicians from Tamil Nadu
Living people
Lok Sabha members from Tamil Nadu
India MPs 2009–2014
Tamil Nadu MLAs 1996–2001
People from Cuddalore district
Tamil Nadu MLAs 1991–1996
1952 births